The 1958 Connecticut gubernatorial election was held on November 4, 1958. Incumbent Democrat Abraham Ribicoff defeated Republican nominee Fred R. Zeller with 62.29% of the vote.

General election

Candidates
Major party candidates
Abraham Ribicoff, Democratic
Fred R. Zeller, Republican

Other candidates
Jasper McLevy, Socialist

Results

References

1958
Connecticut
Gubernatorial